In mathematics, a commutativity constraint    on a monoidal category  is  a choice of isomorphism  for each pair of objects A and B which form a "natural family." In particular, to have a commutativity constraint, one must have  for all pairs of objects .

A braided monoidal category is a monoidal category  equipped with a braiding—that is, a commutativity constraint  that satisfies axioms including the hexagon identities defined below. The term braided references the fact that the braid group plays an important role in the theory of braided monoidal categories. Partly for this reason, braided monoidal categories and other topics are related in the theory of knot invariants.

Alternatively, a braided monoidal category can be seen as a tricategory with one 0-cell and one 1-cell.

Braided monoidal categories were introduced by André Joyal and Ross Street in a 1986 preprint.   A modified version of this paper was published in 1993.

The hexagon identities
For  along with the commutativity constraint  to be called a braided monoidal category, the following hexagonal diagrams must commute for all objects . Here  is the associativity isomorphism coming from the monoidal structure on :

Properties

Coherence

It can be shown that the natural isomorphism  along with the maps  coming from the monoidal structure on the category , satisfy various coherence conditions, which state that various compositions of structure maps are equal. In particular:

 The braiding commutes with the units. That is, the following diagram commutes:

In particular,

as maps . Here we have left out the associator maps.

Variations

There are several variants of braided monoidal categories that are used in various contexts. See, for example, the expository paper of Savage (2009) for an explanation of symmetric and coboundary monoidal categories, and the book by Chari and Pressley (1995) for ribbon categories.

Symmetric monoidal categories

Ribbon categories
A braided monoidal category is a ribbon category if it is rigid, and it may preserve quantum trace and co-quantum trace. Ribbon categories are particularly useful in constructing knot invariants.

Coboundary monoidal categories

A coboundary or “cactus” monoidal category is a monoidal category  together with a family of natural isomorphisms  with the following properties:

The first property shows us that , thus allowing us to omit the analog to the second defining diagram of a braided monoidal category and ignore the associator maps as implied.

Examples

 The category of representations of a group (or a Lie algebra) is a symmetric monoidal category where .
 The category of representations of a quantized universal enveloping algebra   is a braided monoidal category, where  is constructed using the universal R-matrix. In fact, this example is a ribbon category as well.

Applications

 Knot invariants.
 Symmetric closed monoidal categories are used in denotational models of linear logic and linear types.
Description and classification of topological ordered quantum systems.

References

Chari, Vyjayanthi; Pressley, Andrew. "A guide to quantum groups". Cambridge University Press. 1995.
Savage, Alistair. Braided and coboundary monoidal categories. Algebras, representations and applications, 229–251, Contemp. Math., 483, Amer. Math. Soc., Providence, RI, 2009.   Available on the arXiv

External links
 
John Baez (1999), An introduction to braided monoidal categories, This week's finds in mathematical physics 137.

Braids
Monoidal categories

ru:Симметричная моноидальная категория#Моноидальные категории с заузливанием